Maher is an Arabic given name meaning "skillful" or "talented" or "expert." In Arabic context, it is pronounced "Maa-her."

Notable people with the name include:

Given name
Maher Arar, Syrian-Canadian telecommunications engineer whose legal case involved compensation for "extraordinary rendition" practiced against him
Maher al-Assad, Syrian general and commander of the Republican Guard
Maher Bouallegue, Tunisian Paralympian athlete
Maher Charif, Palestinian Marxist historian
Maher Hamza, Egyptian fencing coach known as Mauro Hamza
Maher Jamal, Syrian politician
Maher Abd al-Rashid, Iraqi Army General during the Saddam Hussein rule
Maher Sabra (born 1992), Lebanese footballer
Maher Sabry, Egyptian theater director, playwright, film director, producer and screenwriter, poet, writer
Maher Zain, Arab-Swedish R&B singer, songwriter and music producer of Lebanese origin

See also
Maher (surname); can be of Arabic, Indian subcontinent, and Irish origin